The M-84 is a Yugoslav main battle tank, a variant of the Soviet T-72 tank. The M-84 is still in service in Croatia, Serbia, Bosnia and Herzegovina, Slovenia and Kuwait.

Development and production

Development
The M-84 is based on the Soviet T-72M, the export variant of T-72A, with many improvements, including a domestic fire-control system that the T-72M lacked, improved composite armor, and a 1,000-hp engine. The M-84 entered service with the Yugoslav People's Army in 1984, and the improved M-84A version entered service a few years later. Other variants were introduced later, most being modernization packages.

Production in Yugoslavia

About 240 Yugoslav factories directly participated in the production of the M-84, and about 1,000 others participated indirectly. The manufacturer was chosen by Josip Broz Tito to be the Đuro Đaković in Croatia, over other proposed manufacturers in Serbia: Goša FOM Smederevska Palanka and Mašinska Industrija Niš, at that time the biggest producers of locomotives and wagons in Yugoslavia.  The biggest manufacturers directly involved in production of the M84 main battle tank in SFR Yugoslavia and Federal republic of Yugoslavia among former republics were:

Bratstvo, Novi Travnik, Bosnia and Herzegovina,- gun with barrel 125mm
Slovenske železarne, Ravne, Slovenia - steel, turret and armor 
Iskra, Slovenia - laser designation
FAMOS, Sarajevo, Bosnia and Herzegovina - engine
PPT-Petoletka, Trstenik, Serbia - hydraulics and turret movement system
ATB Sever, Subotica, Serbia - automatic loading system 
Rudi Čajavec, Banja Luka, Bosnia and Herzegovina - electronics and communications systems
Zrak, Sarajevo, Bosnia and Herzegovina - optics
Pretis, Vogošća, Bosnia and Herzegovina - ammunition
Sloboda, Čačak, Serbia - ammunition
Zastava Arms, Kragujevac, Serbia - coaxial 7.62mm and anti-air 12.7mm machine gun
Metalski Zavod Tito, Skopje, North Macedonia - transmission parts
14. oktobar, Kruševac, Serbia - modular tank engine manufacturer, engine and transmission parts
Đuro Đaković, Slavonski Brod, Croatia - finalist, tank hull, metalwork, assembly line, maintenance, LCS

Production and development in Serbia

Development

Military Technical Institute, Belgrade  - primary designer of tanks, designer and developer of reactive armor and other armor, materials like high quality steel for armor, tank ammunition, tank engines, modernization suits and designer of tank crew training and simulation system - TOPOT

Producers in Serbia

ATB Sever, Subotica - automatic loading system
Sloboda, Čačak - ammunition and smoke discharge units
PPT Namenska, Trstenik - hydraulics, transmission parts and turret movement system
Teleoptik-žiroskopi, Zemun - optics, gyroscopes and gyroscopic devices and Fire-control system with software, electronics and electronic elements of active protection system
Zastava Arms, Zastava kovačnica subsidiary, Kragujevac - tank tracks
Technical Overhaul Institute "Čačak" - reactive and other armor, overhaul and modernization center and possible finalist for new tanks
14. oktobar, Kruševac -  modular tank engine manufacturer, engine and transmission parts, shell parts for ammunition  
Yugoimport SDPR, Borbeni složeni sistemi subsidiary, Velika Plana - 125mm gun and barrels, welded turrets, rcws, radio-logical-chemical subsystem, fire suppression subsystems
Imtel komunikacije, Belgrade - UORZ - Radar warning and direction finding system - part of protection system
Zastava Arms, Kragujevac - machine-guns 12.7mm and coaxial 7.62mm

The M-84ASA, a Serbian version of the M-84, was unveiled in 2004. It has a new fire control system, Kontakt-5 ERA armor, AT-11 Sniper anti-tank missiles, Agava-2 thermal sight, and the Shtora defensive suite. It is very similar to the Russian T-90S in appearance and in capability. The latest prototype version from Serbia, M-84AS1, unveiled in 2017, has a new fire control system with domestic laser and radar warning system, RCWS 12.7mm and soft active protection suite with a new version of domestic explosive reactive armor (ERA). A later prototype of the same tank unveiled in 2020 has better-shaped ERA M19 reactive armour, some new situational awareness equipment, and new ammunition.

Exports

About 150 M-84 tanks were exported to Kuwait. The disintegration of Yugoslavia in the 1990s prevented further exports of the M-84. Sales of the M84 including negotiations of contracts with foreign partners were done through Yugoimport SDPR, at that time acting as a Yugoslav state agency. Production and delivery was  performed by Đuro Đaković.

Design

Armament
The M-84A is armed with a 125 mm smoothbore cannon derived from the Soviet 2A46. The fume extractor positioned in the middle of the barrel is shielded with a thermal coating that minimizes deformation of the barrel from high temperatures and ensures it is cooled at the same rate during rapid firing. The M-84 uses an automatic loader, which enables it to sustain a firing rate of 8 rounds per minute.

The cannon's 40 rounds of ammunition are stowed in the hull of the tank beneath the turret. This concept was inherited from the original Soviet design for the T-72, and is both a strength and weakness of the tank. The lower hull beneath the turret is one of the least likely place to be hit and penetrated by antitank rounds or mines, but in the event of penetration and secondary detonation of the ammunition the crew and tank are unlikely to survive the resulting catastrophic explosion.

Along with its primary armament, the M-84 is also armed with one 7.62mm coaxial machine gun, and one 12.7mm anti-aircraft gun mounted on the commander's turret.

All versions of the M-84 have a crew of three. The commander sits on the right side of the turret, the gunner on the left, and the driver sits centrally at the front of the vehicle. Like most Soviet-derived vehicles, the M-84 series of tanks have an autoloader rather than a manual loader.

Protection
The basic tank has a cast steel turret with maximal thickness of 410mm; later, in the M-84A version, a segment made out of a non-metal, most likely rubber and boron carbide (see Chobham armour), was sandwiched between layers of steel. The glacis uses laminate armor, glass in plastic resin between two steel plates; in the A version a 16mm steel plate was welded on the glacis. Total armor protection ranges between 550mm-650mm for the glacis and 560mm-700mm for the turret. During the wars in Yugoslavia the M-84's frontal armor proved very effective against any type of AT threat. Side or rear hits often result in a catastrophic ammo explosion.

Twelve smoke grenades are positioned in front of the turret in banks of five and seven grenades. Night vision and gunner's sights are positioned on the top-right side of the turret. The M-84 has a searchlight used in short-range combat situations.

The M-84 tank has nuclear, biological and chemical (NBC) protection capabilities.

Mobility
The base M-84 engine is a 12-cylinder water-cooled V46-6 diesel engine, rated at 574 kW (780 hp). The improved M-84A has a more powerful, V46-TK 735 kW (1,000 hp) engine. With maximum fuel load of 1,200 litres the tank's range is 450 km, extendable to 650 km, with external fuel tanks.

The Croatian-made variants have enhanced power plants. The M-84A4 Sniper model has a German-built  engine, while the M-84D has an  engine, the most powerful of all M-84 variants. The M-84D also has greater fuel capacity (1,450 litres).

The tank can ford 1.2 meters of water, increasing to 5 meters with a snorkel.

Variants
M-84 (Yugoslavia) – The initial version based on the Soviet T-72M and produced between 1984 and 1987. Less than 150 units manufactured.
M-84A (Yugoslavia) – An upgraded version similar to the Soviet T-72M1 but with a significantly more powerful engine and additional armour plating. It comes with the new SUV-M-84 computerized fire-control system, including the DNNS-2 gunner's day/night sight, with independent stabilization in two planes and integral laser rangefinder. It also comes with the TNP-160 periscope, TNPA-65 auxiliary periscope, and DNKS-2 day/night commander's periscopes, as well as the TNPO-168V driver's periscope. Produced between 1988 and 1991, closely analogous to the M-84AB. Roughly 450 vehicles manufactured including the M-84AB.
M-84AB (Yugoslavia) – Kuwaiti version of the M-84A. The M-84AB is fitted with new communication and intercom systems. The Kuwaiti 35th Ash-Shahid (Martyr's) Armoured Brigade, armed with several dozen M-84ABs, took part in Operation Desert Storm. During the fighting two M-84AB's were lost, but both were later recovered. Kuwait originally ordered over 200 tanks, but received only 150 before the break-up of Yugoslavia and the end of tank production. All instruments marked in English and Arabic.
M-84ABN (Yugoslavia) – The M-84AB fitted with land navigation equipment.
M-84AK / ABK Command Tank (Yugoslavia) - M-84AB version fitted with extensive communication equipment, land navigation equipment, and a generator for the command role.
M-91 "Vihor" ("whirlwind") (Yugoslavia) -Further development of the M-84, with the main focus being improving the tank's firepower by installing modern optics and developing improved APFSDS shells. The turret was also redesigned, and some sources say that a new 1200 HP engine was planned. At least 2 prototypes were made before the outbreak of the civil war.
M-84A4 Sniper (Croatia, Slovenia) – This version includes the all-new SCS-84 day/night sight, DBR-84 ballistic computer and improved elevation and traverse sensors. Croatia purchased around 40 of these models from 1996 till 2003 from its domestic factory. It is rumored, but not officially confirmed, that these tanks have a different engine of German origin, rated at 1,100 hp instead of the 1,000 hp engine originally installed. A Racal communication suite replaced the older communication set. By 2008 the entire Croatian M-84 tank fleet had been upgraded to the M-84A4 standard.
M-84AI armored recovery vehicle (Yugoslavia and Poland) – During the mid-1990s Kuwait requested an armored recovery vehicle variant of the M-84A tank as part of the deal to buy a large batch of M-84A tanks. The vehicle had to be developed in very short time so it was decided that it should be based on an already working foreign vehicle rather than designed and built independently. The Polish WZT-3 license was bought and Polish parts were used in the M-84AI project completed in the "14 October" factory in Kruševac. There was also a plan for a M-84ABI for Kuwait, but this idea failed. It is armed only with a 12.7mm machine-gun fitted to the commander's hatch and 12 smoke grenade mortars (8 right and 4 left). Standard equipment includes: A TD-50 crane, front-mounted stabilizing dozer blade, main and secondary winches.
M-84AS (Serbia) – Upgrade package of the M-84A. Adding a new fire control system, new armor consisting of cylindrical pad, high-hardness steel, titanium, aluminum, and NERA as well as modular Kontakt-5 armor, new AT-11 Sniper and Agava-2 thermal sights, and the Shtora defense suite. The first public appearance of the M-84AS was in July 2004 at the Nikinci military base. It appeared to be very similar to the Russian T-90S, both in appearance and in capability. The differences reportedly consist of better armor on the T-90S, whereas the M-84AS has superior maneuverability. The M-84AS was also tested by the Kuwaiti Army as part of an international tender. It can survive multiple hits at relatively close ranges from ATGM's or other hits from tanks. New thermal imaging cameras were mounted for the commander and driver so that the tank can operate at night. It is fitted with the 125 mm 2A46M smooth-bore gun and a 1,200 hp diesel engine giving a maximum speed of 72 km/h. A number of undisclosed Arab countries were interested in purchasing the M-84AS.
M-84AS1 (Serbia) – Latest Serbian variant in prototype stage. Adds additional armor, including explosive reactive armor, integrated day-night sighting system with thermal imager, command information system, a soft-kill active protection system, new radio system, Remote-controlled Weapons Station with 12.7 mm machine gun, and CBRN protection equipment. Additionally, a domestic-developed 1200 HP engine was proposed, but was not accepted yet.
M-84D (Croatia) – This variant brings existing M-84 variants to the M-84D standard, equipped with a new 1,200 hp (895 kW) engine and new RRAK ERA armor. The M-84D is equipped with a Rafael Defense System – Samson Remote Controlled Weapon Station, and a new Omega ballistic computer (Slovenian Fotona-made digital ballistic computer). M-84A4 and M-84D have an operational range of 700 km and a maximum speed of 65 km/h. The M-84D has also a 15% faster auto loader, enabling a rate of fire of 9, rather than 8, rounds per minute. The M-84D is a second version of the upgraded tanks. It has also chains on the back of the tank to protect the engine and has SLAT armor around the ammunition to prevent an ATG or a shell from hitting it. M-84D received few additional upgrades, Turret basket was added to provide extra space for extra ammunition and to provide increased armor protection. Turret basket has additional slat armor, which adds additional armor to the exterior of the tank. M84D and M84A4 are to receive 12.7mm Kongsberg Protector Remote Weapon Stations which are to be integrated on to all M84D and M84A4 tanks. M-84D will also feature LIRD-4B – Laser irradiation detector and warner and LAHAT anti tank missiles. There is a potential for integration of Swiss 120 mm compact gun developed by RUAG. This option is being now seriously considered as this would allow Croatia to use NATO 120 m standard ammunition. 120 mm RUAG compact gun is a preferred option over German Rheinmetall L44 120 mm cannon which is more expensive and would require German support, whereas RUAG will provide technical know how and technology transfer to Đuro Đaković specijalna vozila d.d. Only two Croatian tanks have been upgraded to this standard due to budgetary restraints.

Gallery

Operational history

Desert Storm

Prior to the Persian Gulf War, Kuwait ordered 170 M-84ABs, 15 M-84ABI ARVs and 15 M-84ABK command tanks, from Yugoslavia. Four M-84A tanks were delivered; however, the Iraqi Army soon captured them after the occupation. Further deliveries were stopped for the duration of the war. The Kuwaiti 35th Al-Shaheed Armored Brigade was equipped with 70 M-84s. During the retaking of the country, the 35th Brigade did not directly take part in battles with Iraqi tanks because of the M-84s similarity to Iraqi T-72 or Asad Babils. The M-84 was however very effective against T-62s and T-55s but some unconfirmed reports claim that a few of them were damaged, but recovered and repaired.

Yugoslav Wars

Slovenia
During the Ten-Day War, the Yugoslav People's Army (JNA) attempted to regain control over border crossings, airports and other strategic positions in Slovenia. The Slovenian Territorial Defence had no armored units of its own and JNA M-84s were commonly used to break through barricades. Slovenia inherited all the M-84s within its territory, once the ceasefire and Slovenia's independence was accepted.

Croatia
The M-84 saw action in the Battle of Vukovar, where the JNA and Serbian forces deployed large columns of main battle tanks in urban areas without the adequate support of the infantry. Tanks and APCs found themselves extremely exposed and suffered significant losses mainly to RPGs.
It was noted by anti tank crews that the M-84s were extremely durable in comparison to other vehicles fielded by the JNA. One account from a team in the Battle of Vukovar noted that a single M-84 took 5 rounds from various launchers and direction with a 6th only knocking out its engine forcing its crew to bail out (its main gun being destroyed by a "lucky" AT shot from an RPG-7).

Bosnia and Herzegovina
During the War in Bosnia and Herzegovina, M-84s saw little action, the mainstay of all three warring parties being the T-55.
At the beginning of the war, JNA units stationed in Bosnia and Herzegovina had passed their equipment to the Army of Republika Srpska (VRS). The VRS had several dozen M-84s, with the Army of Bosnia and Herzegovina managing to capture only three M-84s. A number of M-84 tanks were used during the Siege of Sarajevo, as well as during smaller localized conflicts. The number of M-84 tanks destroyed during the Bosnian war is unknown.

Preševo Valley 
The M-84 was used by Yugoslav Ground Forces in Oraovica village during Insurgency in the Preševo Valley.

Operators

Current operators

The Armed Forces of Bosnia and Herzegovina are equipped with 71 M-84 MBTs. In 2008, at least 50 operational tanks were withdrawn from active service due to financial reasons.

 The Croatian Army is equipped with 72 M-84A4 Sniper MBTs; awaiting further upgrades. It plans to upgrade 48 tanks to M-84A5 standard by 2020; remaining tanks will be put to reserve status or stored.

 The Kuwaiti Army is equipped with 149 M-84 MBTs in AB, ABK and ABN versions bought prior to Operation Desert Storm from Yugoslavia. 
 35th Shahid (Martyr's) Armoured Brigade equipped with 70 M-84s.

 The Serbian Army operates 212 M-84s and M-84AS's with plans to upgrade about 100 tanks to M-84AS2 standard.  
 15th Tank Battalion
 26th Tank Battalion
 36th Tank Battalion
 46th Tank Battalion

The Slovenian Army had 54 M-84 tanks in its fleet. All tanks were modernized to the M-84A4 Sniper standard but only 19 remained in service, while the rest were in operational reserve due to financial reasons. In response to the 2022 Russian invasion of Ukraine, the Slovenian Government initially agreed to donate the tanks to Ukraine, and in return the Slovenian tanks would be replaced by German vehicles. The incumbent Slovenian government rejected the deal, demanding more replacement vehicles. 
 2nd Armored Brigade operates 31 M-84s.

Former operators

 The Yugoslav People's Army operated about 450 M-84s in M-84 and M-84A versions. The M-84 was intended to fully replace the T-34, M4 Sherman and M47 Patton tanks then held in storage as well as some of the older T-55 units. Most JNA tanks were passed to the successor state – FR Yugoslavia, while a number was also captured by Croatia, Bosnia and Herzegovina and Slovenia in the war.
 1st Armored Brigade of 14th Corps at Vrhnika.
 4th Armored Brigade of 10th Corps at Jastrebarsko.
 211th Armored Brigade of 21st Corps at Niš.
 252nd Armored Brigade of 37th Corps at Kraljevo
 329th Armored Brigade of 5th Corps at Banja Luka
 51st Armored Brigade of 24th Corps at Pančevo.
 243rd Armored Brigade of 41st Corps from Skopje.
 265th Armored Brigade of 32nd Corps at Varaždin.

 Federal Republic of Yugoslavia
 Federal Yugoslav Army:
 252nd Armored Brigade of Kragujevac Corps.
 211th Armored Brigade of Niš Corps.

 Serbia and Montenegro
 Ground Forces of Serbia and Montenegro:
 211th Armoured Brigade of Niš Corps.
 243rd Armoured Brigade of Priština Corps.
 252nd Armoured Brigade of Priština Corps.

 Republic of Bosnia and Herzegovina
 Army of the Republic of Bosnia and Herzegovina captured and operated 3 M-84s.
 3rd Corps, operated 2 M-84s.
 5th Corps, operated 1 M-84.

 The Army of Republika Srpska (VRS) operated about 65 M-84s. Since the VRS was integrated into the Armed Forces of Bosnia and Herzegovina the fate of the remaining M-84s is unknown.
 101st Armored Brigade at Banja Luka operated about 65 M-84s.

 Republic of Serbian Krajina
 Military of Serbian Krajina was equipped with some 31 M-84s.

The Army of North Macedonia inherited an unknown amount of M-84s from the 243rd Armoured Brigade of 41st Corps from Skopje after Macedonia left Yugoslavia in 1993. These tanks are retired and stored.

See also

Related developments
T-72
PT-91 Twardy
M-84AS
M-95 Degman

Designation sequence
T-72 – M-84 – M-91 Vihor – M-84D – M-95 Degman & M-84AS

References

External links

 Article on the M84-AB1 (.pdf, in Serbian)
 M-84 at the FAS.
 —Kuwait deal with Croatia to update M-84 to M-84D.

Main battle tanks of Yugoslavia
Main battle tanks of the Cold War
Soviet Union–Yugoslavia relations
Đuro Đaković (company)
Military Technical Institute Belgrade
Military vehicles introduced in the 1980s
T-72